Statistics of Emperor's Cup in the 1970 season.

Overview
It was contested by 8 teams, and Yanmar Diesel won the championship.

Results

Quarterfinals
Toyo Industries 4–0 Fukuoka University
Hitachi 5–1 Osaka University of Commerce
Mitsubishi Motors 4–0 Osaka University of Economics
Yanmar Diesel 4–2 Hosei University

Semifinals
Toyo Industries 2–1 Hitachi
Mitsubishi Motors 2–2 (lottery) Yanmar Diesel

Final
 
Toyo Industries 1–2 Yanmar Diesel
Yanmar Diesel won the championship.

References
 NHK

Emperor's Cup
Emperor's Cup
1971 in Japanese football